The 2017 FIBA U20 Women's European Championship was the 16th edition of the Women's U-20 European basketball championship. 16 teams participated in the competition, which was played in Matosinhos, Portugal, from 8 to 16 July 2017.

Venues

Participating teams

  (3rd place, 2016 FIBA U20 Women's European Championship Division B)

  (Runners-up, 2016 FIBA U20 Women's European Championship Division B)

  (Winners, 2016 FIBA U20 Women's European Championship Division B)

Preliminary round
In this round, the 16 teams are allocated in four groups of four teams each. All teams advance to the playoff round of 16.

Group A

Group B

Group C

Group D

Knockout stage

Bracket

5th–8th place bracket

9th–16th place bracket

13th–16th place bracket

Final standings

References

External links
FIBA official website

2017
Under-20 Championship
2017–18 in Portuguese basketball
International youth basketball competitions hosted by Portugal
International women's basketball competitions hosted by Portugal
Sport in Matosinhos
July 2017 sports events in Europe
2017 in youth sport